The 2011 Pekao Szczecin Open was a professional tennis tournament played on clay courts. It was the 19th edition of the tournament which was part of the Tretorn SERIE+ of the 2011 ATP Challenger Tour. It took place in Szczecin, Poland between 12 and 18 September 2011.

ATP entrants

Seeds

 1 Rankings are as of August 29, 2011.

Other entrants
The following players received wildcards into the singles main draw:
  Piotr Gadomski
  Andriej Kapaś
  Arkadiusz Kocyła
  Albert Montañés

The following players received entry from the qualifying draw:
  Tihomir Grozdanov
  Renzo Olivo
  Olivier Patience
  Michał Przysiężny

Champions

Singles

 Rui Machado def.  Éric Prodon, 2–6, 7–5, 6–2

Doubles

 Marcin Gawron /  Andriej Kapaś def.  Andrey Golubev /  Yuri Schukin, 6–3, 6–4

External links
Official Website
ITF Search
ATP official site

Pekao Szczecin Open
Pekao
Pekao Szczecin Open